Air University Press is a division of the Academic Services Directorate and housed under the Muir S. Fairchild Research Information Center of Air University, Maxwell AFB, Alabama.
It publishes faculty and student research, academic journals, other materials relevant to the Air University program, school-selected student papers, faculty research efforts, and other documents that support AU's program of professional military education.

Among its paper series are Air War College's Maxwell Papers, Air Command and Staff College's Wright Flyers, the School of Advanced Air and Space Studies's Drew Papers, and the Fairchild, Walker, Chennault and Kenney series.

It also publishes Air and Space Power Journal, the professional journal of the Air Force. Additionally, the Press publishes the distinguished Strategic Studies Quarterly journal, which focuses on issues related to national and international security. Additionally, it publishes two regionally focused academic journals: the Journal of Indo-Pacific Affairs, and the Journal of the Americas.

Air University Press has been a member of the Association of University Presses since 2020.

See also

 List of English-language book publishing companies
 List of university presses

References

External links
Air University Press
Air & Space Power Journal
Strategic Studies Quarterly
Journal of the Americas
Journal of Indo-Pacific Affairs
Air University

University presses of the United States
Air University (United States Air Force)
Organizations based in Montgomery, Alabama